The Shahin missile is an Iranian supersonic mid-range low to mid-altitude surface-to-air missile. It is an Iranian version of the American MIM-23 Hawk and is thus designed for use with the Mersad air defense system.

Unveiling and testing
The shahin missiles were developed as part of a domestic weapons program that Iran started in 1992 as a response to increasing American sanctions against Iran. The Shahin missiles were first unveiled in April 2010. They were then tested on November 16, 2010 along with the Mersad air defense system during the war games Defenders of the Sky of the Velayat III, the maneuvers were themselves carried out to prepare for a hypothetical Israeli assault on Iranian nuclear facilities. The missile was tested again on 13 June 2011 shortly before entering service.

Characteristics
The missile is considered low to mid-altitude and mid-range low with a range of 70-150 km. The missile is also suggested to be supersonic by various sources. Iranian sources suggest that the missile is somewhat indigenous with upgraded guidance, launcher, advanced radar signal processing technology and advanced guidance systems. Iranians also suggest that it has some Anti-ballistic missile capability. The shahin missile possesses a thin yet cylindrical body with four long chord clipped delta wings, an opening at the end also exists which runs from the boat tail to the middle.

See also

Other Iranian air defenses
Sayyad-1
Taer-2
Tabas
Talaash
Shalamcheh

Similar SAMs
S-125 Neva
MIM-23 Hawk

References 

Post–Cold War weapons of Iran
Surface-to-air missiles of Iran
Guided missiles of Iran
Anti-ballistic missiles of Iran
Military equipment introduced in the 2010s